Master of Lamentation from Zvíkov was a late Gothic carver who worked in south-west Bohemia in the first third of the 16th century.

Life and work 
The very rich artistic culture of the Úhlava and upper Otava basin reached its peak at the turn of the 15th and 16th centuries in the commissions of Botho Schwihau von Riesenberg and Zdeněk Lev of Rožmitál (Zdeniek Lev von Rosental). The Master of Lamentation from Zvíkov probably came from the workshop of the Master of Lamentation from Žebrák. He has been known only since the 1960s, because some of his sculptures were previously mistakenly attributed to the Master of Lamentation from Žebrák. If he had his own independent workshop, he worked somewhere on the so called Golden Trail (Goldener Steig) - either in Kašperské Hory or Sušice.

The most famous work of this anonymous master is the Lamentation of Christ from the chapel at Zvíkov Castle, which depicts Mary kneeling in silent prayer over the body of Christ. The composition of the relief is similar to that of the Brussels painting by the Dutch painter Petrus Christus. The body of the dead man lies on a shroud laid on the ground, and his head and shoulder rest on Mary's right knee.

In the Viennese Lamentation of Christ the motif of the Pietà and the standing figures of St John, Joseph of Arimathea and The Three Marys is used. The expressively contorted body of Jesus recalls the dead man of the Lamentation by another anonymous carver - Master of Lamentation from Žebrák.

Notable works (selection) 
 relief of the Lamentation of Christ from the Zvíkov Castle Chapel
 Relief of the Lamentation of Christ, Diocesan Museum in Vienna
 large altarpiece, St. Margaret's Church in Kašperské Hory (three main figures from the ark's case - Madonna, St. Margaret and St. Linhart and the crucified Christ from its extension - have been preserved)
 statues of the Madonna, St. Barbara and St. Catherine of Černívsko
 statue of the Madonna from the branch church in Kocelovice - Lnáře (workshop)
 Female Saint of Homole

Exhibitions (selection) 
 2013 Images of Beauty and Salvation, Medieval Meat Marketplace Building, Plzeň
 2014 Gothic in Southwest Bohemia: Images of Beauty and Salvation, National Gallery in Prague, Šternberk Palace
 2014 Gothic Art in the Otava and Úhlava Regions, Museum of Sumava, Kašperské Hory

References

Sources 
 Mgr. Bc. Gabriela Zítková, Master of the Zvíkov Lamentation, Bachelor thesis, Catholic Theological Faculty, Institute of the History of Christian Art, Prague 2007
 Michaela Ottová, Petr Jindra (eds.), Images of Beauty and Salvation, Arbor Vitae, Řevnice 2013, ISBN 978-80-7467-059-6
 Michaela Ottová, in: Jiří Tušl et al., Nástin dějin evropského umění, Fortuna Praha 2008, p.108, ISBN 978-80-7168-996-6
 Peter Kováč, The Master of the Zvíkov Lamentation and Kašperské Hory, in: Collection of National History Works on Šumava on the 650th Anniversary of the Town of Kašperské Hory, Kašperské Hory 1980, pp. 109-125.
 Maršálková Sekerová Daniela, Master of the Lamentation of Christ from Žebrák, Master of the Relief of the Lamentation of Christ from Zvíkov and their mutual relationship, Master's thesis, 1971

External links 
 Peter Kováč: The Viennese Lamentations of the Master of Zvíkov
 Gothic Art in the Otava and Úhlava Regions, Museum of Šumava in Kašperské Hory 2015
 Images of Beauty and Salvation. Gothic in Southwest Bohemia: Exhibits from the Diocese of České Budějovice at an exhibition in Pilsen
Gothic sculptors
16th-century sculptors
Woodcarvers
Lamentation from Zvikov